The Shershen is a Belarusian third generation anti-tank guided missile (ATGM), based on Belarusian-Ukrainian ATGM Skif but reportedly with additional capabilities. Designed to defeat modern armored vehicles, protected objects (such as bunkers, pillboxes, earth-and-timber emplacements) and low-speed low-altitude targets (helicopters, UAVs).

Description 
The "Shershen" base version consists of a tripod, a universal combat module, an anti-tank guided missile, a guidance device (PN-S) and a remote control, which allows the control of the unit from up to 100 m (with a wire channel) and up to 300 m (with radio). The two-man crew's combat task is to assemble "Shershen", find the target and launch. The pre-launch procedures, which  include missile installation, PN-S connection and unit switch-on, take less than 2 minutes to complete. Once the missile is fired, the operator controls the "Shershen" and corrects the aim, if necessary, using the joystick on the remote control.

Shershen is designed to destroy armored vehicles equipped with explosive reactive armor (ERA) and can attack stationary and moving targets. Shershen also has automated fire and forget targeting mode that doesn't require manual tracking of a target.

The R-2V missile (can be used with "Shershen-Q" and unified with ATGM "Barier-V" ) extends the maximum range to 7,500m. The ability to use different types of missiles without any system modification, in addition to a wide spectrum of targets makes it possible to consider this system not only as an ATGM, but as a mobile defence-assault fire system for infantry support up to battalion level.

Variants 
 "Shershen" — base version.
 "Shershen-L" — light version (maximum range up to 2.5 km.)
 "Shershen-D" — version with two firing channels.
 "Shershen-Q" — version with two firing channels and auto lifting system (or without auto lift) for installation on a vehicle.

Users

Gallery

See also 
 OMTAS
 FGM-148 Javelin
 Type 01 LMAT
 9M133 Kornet
 BGM-71 TOW
 9K115-2 Metis-M
 NLAW
 Stugna-P

References

External links 

 
 
 
 Di PRJ Ada 'Perang' Rudal Anti Tank
 ATGM "Shershen" in blogs

Anti-tank guided missiles
Military equipment introduced in the 2010s
Fire-and-forget weapons